Banyule City SC is an Australian soccer club from Viewbank. Banyule City plays their matches in the Victorian State League Division 1.

It sits at Level 3 on the Victorian league system (Level 4 of the overall Australian league system)



History 
Banyule City SC was founded as Rosanna in 1969. The club changed its name to Banyule City in 1995.

Honours 
 Victorian State League Division 2 North-West Champions 2015
 Victorian Provisional League Division One Runners Up 1982
 Victorian Provisional Division Three Champions 1981
 Victorian State League Division 3 North-West Champions 2009
 Victorian League Division 4 Champions 1985
 Victorian State League Division 4 Runners Up 1993

Ex-Players 
  George Campbell (1997-1998)

External links 
 Banyule City Soccer Club
 OzFootballSite

Victorian State League teams
Soccer clubs in Melbourne
Sport in the City of Banyule
Association football clubs established in 1969
1969 establishments in Australia